Peter Cameron Kelly (May 22, 1913 – March 22, 2004) was a Canadian ice hockey right winger who played for several NHL teams.

Career 
Kelly played seven seasons in the National Hockey League for the St. Louis Eagles, Detroit Red Wings, New York Americans and Brooklyn Americans. He won the Stanley Cup twice in his career, with the Detroit Red Wings in 1936 and 1937. After leaving the NHL in 1942 he continue to play senior hockey for several years, finally retiring in 1952.

He was the last surviving former player of the St. Louis Eagles, a team that played just one season in the NHL (1934-35) after relocating from Ottawa.

Career statistics

Regular season and playoffs

Awards and achievements
Stanley Cup Championships (1936 & 1937)
AHL Scoring Champion (1942)
AHL First All-Star Team (1942)
Honoured Member of the Manitoba Hockey Hall of Fame
Two Section One Championships (2003 & 2004)

External links

1913 births
2004 deaths
Brooklyn Americans players
Canadian expatriate ice hockey players in the United States
Canadian ice hockey right wingers
Detroit Red Wings players
New York Americans players
People from St. Vital, Winnipeg
Pittsburgh Hornets players
St. Louis Eagles players
Ice hockey people from Winnipeg
Springfield Indians players
Stanley Cup champions